Niue's women's national rugby league team are a rugby league team that represent Niue at international level. The team played in the 2003 Women's Rugby League World Cup in New Zealand. In 2020 they played their first full international since 2003, losing 66-8 to  Tonga.

Results

Full Internationals

Nines

References

Niue national rugby league team
Women's national rugby league teams